Mateusz Rzeźniczak (born 23 July 1998) is a Polish sprinter specializing in the 400 metres. He competed in the men's 4 × 400 metres relay at the 2020 Summer Olympics.

Career
Rzeźniczak represented Poland in the men's 4 × 400 metres relay at the 2020 Summer Olympics and finished in fifth place.

References

External links

1998 births
Living people
Athletes (track and field) at the 2020 Summer Olympics
Polish male sprinters
Olympic athletes of Poland
21st-century Polish people